Santiago Lambre was born in Porto Alegre, Brazil on July 23, 1975.  His father, Nestor Lambre was a professional show jumping rider with proven success and recognition in South America and Europe, who influenced Santiago’s love for the sport who started riding when he was 5 years old.

Soon after finishing his high school studies,  Santiago decided to move to Europe searching for new challenges in his equestrian career, where he lived and worked in various countries, namely:  Belgium, France, the Netherlands and Germany, achieving quick success as  young rider.   His positive developments as a young rider rapidly made him become a professional in international competitions where he continued his growth as both rider and trainer.

Championships 

Santiago has represented Mexico in various Nations Cups and world Tournaments and has won over 100 international competitions during his career as a Mexican rider.
 1999 Panamerican Games in Winnipeg / Riding Raisa La Silla 
 2000 Olympic Games in Sydney / Riding Dollar de la Pierre (a.k.a. Tlaloc)
 2003 Panamerican Games in Santo Domingo / Riding MarcosW 
 2004 Olympic Games in Athens as reserve rider / Riding Imperio Rouge 
 2007 Panamerican Games in Rio de Janeiro / Riding Curant 
 2014 World Equestrian Games in Normandy / Jhonny Boy

Fei.
Santiago Lambre.
SJA.

References
http://fei.infostradasports.com/asp/lib/theasp.asp?pageid=8937&sportid=311&personid=256203&refreshauto=1
http://www.ecuestreonline.com/santiago-lambre-protagonista-en-el-met/
http://equnews.fr/saut-obstacle/csi-2-rosieres-aux-salines-le-mexique-simpose-dans-la-grosse-epreuve/
http://horsesinternational.com/sport/top-placings-dutch-horses-spruce-meadows/
http://www.ecuestreonline.com/finalizaron-las-pruebas-de-caballos-jovenes-de-la-segunda-fase-del-mediterranean-equestrian-tour/
http://www.ecuestreonline.com/doblete-de-santiago-lambre-en-el-mediterranean-equestrian-tour-2/
http://www.ecuestreonline.com/santiago-lambre-gano-el-gran-premio-del-primer-csi2-del-mediterranean-equestrian-tour/
http://www.ecuestreonline.com/doblete-de-santiago-lambre-en-la-segunda-jornada-del-mediterranean-equestrian-tour/
http://www.horsesinternational.com/sport/show-jumping/santiago-lambre-gallops-victory-vilamoura/
http://www.horsesinternational.com/sport/show-jumping/santiago-lambre-excels-in-gijon/
http://www.ecuestreonline.com/santiago-lambre-gano-la-primera-grande-de-csio-de-barcelona/
http://www.horseshowjumping.tv/node/12054
http://www.elcomercio.es/gijon/20090803/deportes/deporte/santiago-lambre-logra-primera-20090803.html

External links
Santiago Lambre

1975 births
Living people
Mexican male equestrians
Olympic equestrians of Mexico
Mexican people of Brazilian descent
Equestrians at the 2000 Summer Olympics
Equestrians at the 2007 Pan American Games
Pan American Games competitors for Mexico
Pan American Games medalists in equestrian
Pan American Games silver medalists for Mexico
Equestrians at the 2003 Pan American Games
Medalists at the 2003 Pan American Games